Pablo Martín Pérez Álvarez (August 19, 1969 in Maracaibo) is a Venezuelan lawyer, politician and former Governor of Zulia State.

Biography

Studies 
In 1986 he graduated from secondary school with a diploma in Humanities. Pérez Álvarez enrolled at University of Zulia to study law. Later he did postgraduate studies in Public Law at the same university. Pérez Álvarez also studied Gerencia Municipal (municipal management) at Instituto de Estudios Superiores de Administración (IESA), a Venezuelan higher education institute of management.

Political career 
In 1995 he began to work with Manuel Rosales, the mayor of Maracaibo. Pablo Pérez was in charge of the Legal Consultancy of the City Council and was a member of some commissions.

From 2000 to 2008, Manuel Rosales was Governor of Zulia. Pablo Pérez worked with him in some posts. In 2006 Pérez Álvarez was appointed by Rosales as Secretario de Gobierno, the second highest ranking official in the government of  Zulia.

In 2004 Pablo Pérez was candidate of the political party un Nuevo Tiempo for the mayor’s office of Maracaibo. But he was narrowly defeated by the candidate of the Fifth Republic Movement, Gian Carlo di Martino.

Governor of Zulia 
In 2008 he competed for the post of Governor of Zulia with the support of Un Nuevo Tiempo and other political parties opposed to the government of Hugo Chávez during the 2008 regional elections. Pablo Pérez won with 53.59% of the votes.

External links 
  Pablo Pérez Gobernador (Spanish)
  Gobernación del Estado Zulia (Spanish)

Living people
1969 births
Governors of Zulia
People from Maracaibo
Democratic Action (Venezuela) politicians
A New Era politicians
University of Zulia alumni